"Familiar" is a song recorded by English singer Liam Payne and Colombian singer J Balvin. It was written and produced by Mike Sabath, with additional writing from LunchMoney Lewis, Balvin and Sean Douglas. The song was released on 20 April 2018 and appears as a bonus track on Payne's debut studio album LP1.

Release
On 25 February 2018, the artists announced the song on social media while they were shooting the music video in Miami. Payne revealed the song's cover art and release date on 16 April. He also tweeted a video featuring some of the lyrics, writing: "[Balvin,] you're gonna have to teach some of my fans Spanish..." He unveiled a snippet of the song on 19 April, which features J Balvin ad-libbing.

Composition
"Familiar" is a Latin, Latin pop and R&B song. According to Billboard, the song "combines Latin vibes with a summery, R&B sound". The lyrics are about impressing a love interest in a nightclub.

Critical reception
Mike Nied of Idolator opined that the song could easily become Payne's "best track yet", writing that "the Latin-tinged crossover hit is sure to storm the charts across the globe and may become his most successful release to date". He also noted Payne's vocal of being "velvety" and "enticing", before praising the song's "internationally appealing production". Shanté Honeycutt of Billboard said, "upon first listen, [the song] induces flashbacks to Justin Timberlake's "Señorita" [...] as does the video," though she also considered Payne and Balvin "made a hit" all on their own. Rianne Houghton of Digital Spy regarded the song as "an excellent attempt at recreating 'Despacito'".

Music Video
The song's music video was released on 4 May 2018, Directed by Mark Klasferf. Liam is seen dancing shirtless and mingling with various women.

Live performances
Payne and J Balvin performed "Familiar" on 15 May 2018 on Good Morning America, and on The Late Show with Stephen Colbert on 17 May 2018.

Credits and personnel
Credits adapted from Tidal.
Liam Payne – vocals
J Balvin – vocals, composition
LunchMoney – composition
Mike Sabath – composition, production, guitar
Sean Douglas – composition
Randy Merrill – master engineering
John Hanes – engineering
Serban Ghenea – mixing

Charts

Weekly charts

Year-end charts

Certifications

Release history

References

External links
 

2018 songs
2018 singles
Capitol Records singles
J Balvin songs
Liam Payne songs
Spanglish songs
Macaronic songs
Songs written by J Balvin
Songs written by LunchMoney Lewis
Songs written by Sean Douglas (songwriter)
Male vocal duets
Songs written by Mike Sabath